Angela Nagle (born 1984) is an American-born Irish academic and non-fiction writer who has written for The Baffler, Jacobin, and others. She is the author of the book Kill All Normies, published by Zero Books in 2017, which discusses the role of the internet in the rise of the alt-right and incel movements. Nagle describes the alt-right as a dangerous movement, but she also criticizes aspects of the left that have, she says, contributed to the alt-right's rise. Since 2021, she has been publishing articles on a wide range of personal, political and cultural topics via the online publishing platform Substack.

Life 
Nagle was born in Houston, Texas to Irish parents, then grew up in Dublin, Ireland. She graduated from Dublin City University with a PhD for a thesis titled 'An investigation into contemporary online anti-feminist movements'.

The alt-right and the culture wars 
Nagle's book Kill All Normies: Online Culture Wars from 4chan and Tumblr to Trump and the Alt-Right discusses the role of the internet in the rise of the alt-right and incel movements. She describes the alt-right as a counterculture of young men who reject taboos on race and gender. While many young people in the alt-right started simply as trolls, she says the movement has developed into something much more serious. While she supports identity politics in general, she says that some on the left have contributed to the rise of the alt-right with their "performative wokeness", which often involves censoring people and ganging up on them. She has also expressed concerns about "the woke cultural revolution sweeping Irish society".

The book received many positive reviews, and Nagle became a welcome commentator on the topic of online culture wars. Columnist Ross Douthat of The New York Times praised Nagle's "portrait of the online cultural war". Another New York Times contributor, Michelle Goldberg, wrote that Kill All Normies had "captured this phenomenon". Novelist George Saunders listed Kill All Normies as one of his ten favorite books. A highly negative review was written for the anarcho-communist Libcom.org, which took issue with Nagle's supposed bolstering of right-wing narratives around trans issues and trigger warnings. Fusion TV's documentary Trumpland: Kill All Normies directed by Leighton Woodhouse was based on the Nagle's book.

Open borders 
In November 2018, American Affairs published Nagle's essay "The Left Case against Open Borders", in which she voiced opposition to immigration from a left-wing perspective.

The Nation responded with a critical essay, calling it "just one of the volley of pieces by liberals and people to the left of center who have derided the out-of-touch utopianism of open-borders advocates." Author Atossa Araxia Abrahamian identifies former Harvard president Larry Summers, author John Judis, and former secretary of state Hillary Clinton as others promoting similar views.

Writing in The Independent, Slovenian philosopher and academic Slavoj Žižek commented on the "ferocious attacks on Angela Nagle for her outstanding essay." American cultural theorist and author Catherine Liu defended Nagle, considering her to be "one of the brightest lights in a new generation of left writers and thinkers who have declared their independence from intellectual conformity".

Bibliography

References

Further reading 
 
 Nagle's blog

Living people
Date of birth missing (living people)
21st-century non-fiction writers
Irish non-fiction writers
Irish women non-fiction writers
21st-century Irish writers
21st-century Irish women writers
People associated with Dublin City University
1984 births